Social engineering may refer to:

 Social engineering (political science), a means of influencing particular attitudes and social behaviors on a large scale
 Social engineering (security), obtaining confidential information by manipulating and/or deceiving people and artificial intelligence

See also 
 Cultural engineering
 Manufacturing Consent (disambiguation)
 Mass media
 Noble lie
 Propaganda
 Social dynamics
 Social software
 Social technology
 Urban planning

Social science disambiguation pages